Fernando Navarro Morán (born 18 April 1989) is a Mexican professional footballer who plays as a right-back for Liga MX club Toluca.

International career
Navarro was named in Mexico's provisional squad for the 2015 CONCACAF Gold Cup but was cut from the final roster. He made his senior national team debut on 5 June 2019, in a friendly match against Venezuela, as a starter in a 3–1 victory.

Career statistics

International

International goals
Scores and results list Mexico's goal tally first.

Honours
Atlante
CONCACAF Champions League: 2008–09

Tigres UANL
Mexican Primera División: Apertura 2011

León
Liga MX: Apertura 2013, Clausura 2014, Guardianes 2020

Mexico
CONCACAF Gold Cup: 2019

Individual
Liga MX Best XI: Guardianes 2020
Liga MX Best full-back: 2020–21

References

External links

1989 births
Living people
Footballers from Mexico City
Atlante F.C. footballers
Liga MX players
Mexican footballers
Mexico international footballers
Association football midfielders
2019 CONCACAF Gold Cup players
CONCACAF Gold Cup-winning players